The Henry Ford Estate may refer to:

 Fair Lane, the Henry Ford Estate in Dearborn, Michigan
 Ford Winter Estate, part of the Edison and Ford Winter Estates in Fort Myers, Florida